Nour Eissa Meer Abdulrahman (born 16 July 1967) is an Emirati former 
footballer who played as a right-back for the UAE national team and Sharjah FC. He played in the 1990 FIFA World Cup along with his twin brother Ibrahim.

References

External links
 
 

1967 births
Living people
Emirati footballers
Association football fullbacks
United Arab Emirates international footballers
1988 AFC Asian Cup players
1990 FIFA World Cup players
1992 AFC Asian Cup players
Sharjah FC players
Emirati twins
Twin sportspeople
UAE Pro League players